Martijn Franciscus Reuser (born 1 February 1975) is a Dutch former professional footballer who played top-flight football in both the Netherlands and England. He made one appearance for the Netherlands national team.

Career
Born in Amsterdam, Reuser began his career at Dutch club Ajax and, having joined at youth level, made the step up to play in the first team. He was a skilful, goal-scoring midfielder who looked capable of being a permanent fixture in the Dutch national setup. His career was looking very promising, but he suffered a serious knee injury, which appeared to end his Ajax career. He moved to another Dutch side, Vitesse. It was here that Reuser made his one and only international appearance against Ghana in a friendly. He did not really hit it off at Vitesse and was re-signed by Ajax.

He made only one appearance for the first team and he was loaned to English club Ipswich Town in the 1999–2000 season after being scouted by Romeo Zondervan. Having scored a late winner on his début against Fulham and a memorable goal to seal off Ipswich's play-off win against Barnsley at Wembley, Ipswich signed him on a permanent basis. During his four-year stay at Portman Road he established a reputation as a free-kick taker. He was troubled by injury problems during his Ipswich Town career. Despite this, he managed to score six goals in his first full season with the club, establishing himself as one of the most dangerous attacking midfielders in the Premier League, helping Ipswich to an impressive fifth-place finish in the 2000–01 season and a return for the club to UEFA Cup football. After that, however, the injuries really set in. Ipswich were relegated the following season and he also fell out with new manager Joe Royle.

Reuser left Ipswich and joined Willem II for the 2004–05 season. He was less troubled by injury in the Netherlands, but he missed two months of the season with Achilles tendon problems. He was still the club's top scorer as the team finished 11th in the table. The following season was more difficult for Willem II. Reuser spent a lot of the season on the sidelines, and the side finished 16th in the table, which meant play-offs again for Reuser. He saved his side, with a hat-trick in their semi-final against FC Zwolle. Reuser signed for another Dutch side RKC Waalwijk for the 2006–07 season. He played for NAC Breda in the 2009–10 season. In January 2012, Reuser was linked with a return to former club Ipswich Town.

Coaching career
Reuser started his coaching career in the 2012–13 season, where he worked as an assistant coach for NAC Breda's U19 squad. During 2013, Reuser also did an internship at Ajax. In the 2013–14 season, Reuser was in charge of NAC's U12 squad.

Ahead of the 2014–15 season, Reuser was in charge of NAC's U15s. Beside that, he was also appointed assistant manager of the Dutch U15 national team.

Beside his job for the Dutch U15 national team, Reuser joined ADO Den Haag in June 2015 as assistant coach for their U17s. In the summer 2016, Reuser took charge of ADO's U16s.

After leaving ADO in June 2018, Reuser worked in several roles for the Dutch youth national teams.

Career statistics

Club

International

Honours
Ajax
Eredivisie: 1993–94, 1994–95, 1995–96, 1997–98
Johan Cruyff Shield: 1995
Intercontinental Cup: 1995

Ipswich Town
Football League First Division play-offs: 2000

References

External links

1975 births
Living people
Footballers from Amsterdam
Dutch footballers
Association football midfielders
Netherlands under-21 international footballers
Netherlands international footballers
AFC Ajax players
SBV Vitesse players
Ipswich Town F.C. players
Willem II (football club) players
RKC Waalwijk players
NAC Breda players
Eredivisie players
English Football League players
Premier League players
Dutch expatriate footballers
Expatriate footballers in England